Wacken may refer to:
 Wacken, Schleswig-Holstein, a municipality in Germany
 Wacken Open Air, heavy metal festival held in Wacken
 Wacken, former name of Wakken, a village in Belgium